Shiyan Rural District is a rural district (dehestan) in the Central District of Eslamabad-e Gharb County, Kermanshah Province, Iran. At the 2006 census, its population was 6,801, in 1,512 families. The rural district has 13 villages.

References 

Rural Districts of Kermanshah Province
Eslamabad-e Gharb County